The dwarf pufferfish (Carinotetraodon travancoricus), also known as the Malabar pufferfish, pygmy pufferfish, or pea pufferfish, is a small freshwater pufferfish endemic to Kerala and southern Karnataka in Southwest India. They are popular in aquaria for their bright colours and small size. At a maximum length of 3.5 cm, dwarf pufferfish are one of the smallest pufferfish in the world. They closely resemble the related Carinotetraodon imitator, and the two can be difficult to distinguish. C. imitator was not recognised as a different species until 1999.

Dwarf pufferfish dwell at the bottom of heavily vegetated waterways, predating small animals. Unlike other species of pufferfish, they are found in large groups in the wild. They breed throughout most of the year, with spawning pairs producing 1-5 eggs in 1-4 day intervals. Habitat loss and overharvesting for the aquarium trade threaten wild populations of dwarf pufferfish.

Taxonomy
The dwarf pufferfish was first described as Tetraodon (Monotretus) travancoricus in 1941 by S.L. Hora and K.K. Nair, with the type locality given as "Pamba River, Central Travancore". Carinotetraodon was considered a synonym of Tetraodon until 1978, when J.C. Tyler treated it as a valid genus in a paper about Carinotetraodon lorteti, which was an opinion followed by M. Kottelat et al. in 1993 and K.K.P. Lim and M. Kottelat in 1995. The first use of "Carinotetraodon travancoricus" was in 1999 by R. Britz and M. Kottelat when first describing Carinotetraodon imitator, a superficially similar and closely related species previously mistaken for dwarf pufferfish. "Carinotetraodon" is derived from the Latin word  "carina" (keel-shaped, shell) and Greek words "tetra" (four) and "odous" (teeth). The justification for moving to Carinotetraodon was based largely on osteological evidence and not on the presence of skin keels, which other members of the genus have, but which had not been confirmed in dwarf pufferfish until one year later in aquarium literature. Specifically, dwarf pufferfish possess vertebral modifications and a reduced number of total vertebrae similar to other members of Carinotetraodon, in addition to a small size and the presence of sexual dimorphism, also found amongst other members of this genus.

Carinotetraodon is a polyphyletic genus, meaning members do not necessarily share an immediate common ancestor but have been grouped based on common characteristics. The following cladogram is based on molecular evidence and illustrates the polyphyletic nature of the genus Carinotetraodon:

{{clade
|label1=Tetraodontidae
|1={{clade
   |label1=
   |1={{clade
      |label1=
      |1={{clade
         |1=Auriglobus modestus
         |label2=
         |2={{clade
            |1=Leiodon cutcutia
            |label2=
            |2={{clade
               |label1=
               |1=
               |label2=
               |2={{clade
                  |1=Pao palembangensis                  |2=Pao cochinchinensis                  }}
               }}
            }}
         }}
      |label2=
      |2=
      |label3=
      |3=
      }}
   }}
}}

Description

The maximum documented size is  total length (TL), with individuals typically reaching less than  TL, making dwarf pufferfish one of the smallest pufferfish in the world. Both sexes are primarily greenish-yellow, with dark green to brown-black iridescent patches on the flanks and dorsal surface. Patterns and colouration vary considerably between individuals. Their pectoral fins are short, fan-shaped, and described as "slightly emarginate", that is to say, slightly indented at the tip. The dorsal and anal fins are situated opposite each other toward the posterior of the fish, both short and round, while the caudal fin is larger than the other fins and truncate, in that it terminates in a more-or-less vertical edge. Their bodies are round and oblong. As with other members of the genus, sexual dimorphism is apparent in mature fish, with males being more brightly coloured than females and having a yellow ventral surface. Males can also have a dark stripe down the centre of their pale belly and iridescent, blue "eye wrinkle" patterns that females do not have. Females are more rounded, tend to be larger than males, and may or may not show more small spots between their larger dark markings. Their abdomens are white, and they may have a yellow patch on their throat.

Natural defenses
All pufferfish can inflate, or "puff up", their bodies by quickly ingesting large amounts of water (or air when necessary) into their highly elastic stomachs. Like many other pufferfish, in the absence of scales, dwarf pufferfish also have skin spines on most of their body. These spines become erect when the fish is inflated. These characteristics are anti-predator adaptations that make the fish difficult to swallow or bite. Biologists believe these adaptations evolved because of the slow swimming speeds of pufferfish. As an exercise, pufferfish will occasionally inflate to stretch their stomachs to avoid injuring themselves when inflating under duress. Inflation is thought to be stressful and perhaps painful for the fish.

Though many freshwater pufferfish accumulate saxitoxin in their organs due to their consumption of specific cyanobacteria present on or in their food sources, no research has been published confirming or denying the presence of this neurotoxin in dwarf pufferfish.

Resemblance to Carinotetraodon imitatorCarinotetraodon imitator is a species of related pufferfish closely resembling dwarf pufferfish. They are of similar size, shape, patterns, and colouration. Both species are found within the same region and may be sympatric, possibly inhabiting the same waters. Until 1999, C. imitator was mistaken as the same species, and the two could be found together in aquaria and were widely available in the international aquarium trade, both sold as dwarf pufferfish. Dwarf pufferfish can be distinguished from their congener (a member of the same genus), as C. imitator have smaller, faint blotches compared to dwarf pufferfish, as well as greatly reduced body spination. Male dwarf pufferfish have a darker yellow colouration and an iridescent "eye wrinkle" not found in males of C. imitator.

Distribution and habitat
Although closely related to marine pufferfish, they are not found in salt water, and reports to the contrary are based on misidentification. Dwarf pufferfish are one of only 27 known species of Tetraodontidae known to be adapted to freshwater. They are a migratory, or potamodromous, species endemic to rivers, lakes, and estuaries in Kerala and southern Karnataka in the Western Ghats of Peninsular India. Inhabiting heavily vegetated waters with beds of gravel and rock or clay loam with silt and sand, the species is reported from 13 rivers in Kerala, including Pamba River, Chalakudy River, Periyar, Kechery, Muvattupuzha, Vembanad, Meenachil River, Cherthala, Nilambur harbours, and Kallar Stream, part of the Neyyar Wildlife Sanctuary. They have been reported as rare in Bharathapuzha and the Nilgiri Biosphere Reserve. The species was also found in inundated brickyards in Puthukkad, as well as ditches, ponds, irrigation channels, and artificial tanks or abandoned water bodies in paddy fields. The expansive range of their distribution and their appearances in small, secluded bodies of water is likely mediated in part by piscivorous birds inadvertently dispersing individuals.

During a 2007 field survey, dwarf pufferfish were found in abundance in heavily vegetated, shallow waters, sheltering under floating duckweed. Piscivorous waterfowl were also observed foraging in the waters "in good number". The birds were noted to be of "ubiquitous association" with the waters dwarf pufferfish inhabit, and that dwarf pufferfish also inhabit the Thattekad Bird Sanctuary. The researchers inferred the birds likely predate the dwarf pufferfish, but did not identify the particular bird species.

Conservation status
Several researchers have considered the species endangered, though with no rationale provided. The dwarf pufferfish is officially classified as vulnerable on the IUCN Red List due to declining populations because of damming, indiscriminate deforestation for agriculture, pollution from wastewater, and, primarily, overfishing for the aquarium trade. In 2010, some researchers estimated that the population would decline by 30–40% from 2005 to 2015, while others estimated it had already declined by the same amount between 2005 and 2010.

Diet and behaviour
Dwarf pufferfish are euryphagous carnivores in that they consume a wide variety of animals. The results of studies indicated dwarf pufferfish favour insect larvae but will rely on crustaceans and annelids as alternate feed when the availability of preferable prey decreases. Their diet in the wild mainly consists of small animals such as Cladocera, rotifers, copepods, and Ostracods, and insects such as the larvae of Odonata, Ephemeroptera, Hemiptera, and Diptera, with some amounts of plant matter, largely diatoms and green algae. Sand and detritus, presumably ingested by mistake when feeding on small, bottom-dwelling animals, have also been found in the gut of dwarf pufferfish.

 
In captivity, dwarf pufferfish benefit from a varied diet and will eat small snails such as ramshorn snails, bladder snails, and Malaysian trumpet snails, as well as foods like bloodworms and brine shrimp, which can be fed live or frozen. Other members of the genus feed on zooplankton and various benthic crustaceans and molluscs. Food items of specimens maintained in aquaria appear to be similar. Dwarf pufferfish are commonly associated with plants in the genus Cabomba, and the presence of these plants has been shown to reduce mortality among captive specimens.

Dwarf pufferfish are a slow-swimming, demersal, or bottom-dwelling, species. Unlike many pufferfish species, which are primarily solitary and potentially aggressive or territorial between conspecifics (members of the same species), dwarf pufferfish are found in large shoals, occasionally consisting of hundreds of individuals. They are found mainly during the summer months (January to May) and rarely during the rainy season. Shoaling fish are known to experience stress or weight loss when kept in solitude or in groups too small.

Reproduction
In the wild, males with ripe gonads have been found during all months of the year but December and January, with the peak spawning period extending from May to August, concurring with the South-West monsoon period. Environmental and dietary conditions may influence the maturation rate of individuals.

The mid-dorsal and mid-ventral skin ridges of males become brown in colour during the spawning season. The belly of the female will swell, and the courting male will frequently chase the female and nibble at its belly. The female will then search for a suitable location to spawn while the male chases away other males. In the aquarium, dwarf pufferfish are often plant-spawners, laying eggs in plants, including java moss, or on the substrate hidden within plants. A female will scatter approximately 1–5 eggs,  in mean diameter. The eggs are adhesive and appear transparent and round, with a mass of small oil globules. After laying, the eggs are then fertilized externally by the male. Spawning has been observed in the evening, with the female resting on the spawning site and the male slowly approaching. After spawning, both fish will leave the site. The male will then quickly return to guard the eggs. Sneaking ejaculation by other males has also been observed. The pair may spawn multiple times in 1–4 day intervals.

There is little information on what the larvae eat in the wild. Hatched larvae are a mean of  TL, with eyes incompletely developed and the body a red-brown. The yolk sac is consumed in four days, and the larvae commence swimming after six days, at which point their eyes are completely developed.

There is no information available on the lifespans of these fish in the wild, but aquarists report specimens will live for approximately five years in captivity.

Association with humans
When first described in 1941, K. Nair noted that dwarf pufferfish were a favourite of children, who would catch and use the fish as playthings. They were regarded as "frog tadpoles" by local fishermen and otherwise given little consideration. They are of no interest to fisheries, are not a food fish, and are only valued as ornamental fish in aquaria. Dwarf pufferfish have become popular as aquarium fish thanks to their attractive colours, small size, "puppy dog eyes", and relative ease of maintenance. The dwarf pufferfish is also one of the few aquarium fish to regularly eat small, live snails and thus can be helpful in controlling snail populations.

Notes

References

External links

Pufferfish Enthusiasts Worldwide Dwarf Pufferfish Care Sheet

Carinotetraodon
Fishkeeping
Fish described in 1941
Taxa named by Sunder Lal Hora
Endemic fauna of the Western Ghats
Freshwater fish of India
Species endangered by the pet trade
Species endangered by agricultural development
Species endangered by urbanization
Species endangered by damming
Species endangered by deforestation